Miguel Chaves Sánchez (born February 10, 1955) is a former field hockey player from Spain, who won the silver medal with the Men's National Team at the 1980 Summer Olympics in Moscow.

References

External links
 

1955 births
Living people
Spanish male field hockey players
Olympic field hockey players of Spain
Olympic silver medalists for Spain
Field hockey players at the 1980 Summer Olympics
Olympic medalists in field hockey
Medalists at the 1980 Summer Olympics
Atlètic Terrassa players
20th-century Spanish people